Estadio Municipal de Quillacollo, is a multi-use stadium in Quillacollo, Bolivia. It is currently used mostly for football matches, on club level by local sides Arauco Prado and Atlético Palmaflor. The stadium has a capacity of 8,000 spectators.

In 2022, the stadium was renovated to host matches of the Primera División, as their main team Atlético Palmaflor were playing in the Estadio Félix Capriles. In September 2022, the stadium hosted its first professional match, as Palmaflor faced Royal Pari in a Primera División contest.

In the 2022 Clausura tournament, Municipal de Quillacollo also hosted matches of Universitario de Vinto.

References

External links
Soccerway team profile

Football venues in Bolivia
Buildings and structures in Cochabamba Department